Chaminda Niroshan was a Sri Lankan cricketer. He was a right-handed batsman and a right-arm bowler who played for Moratuwa Sports Club.

Niroshan made a single first-class appearance for the side, during the 1993–94 season, against Tamil Union. From the lower-middle order, he scored 3 runs in the first innings in which he batted, and, when pushed further up in the order for the second innings, scored 1 run.

Niroshan bowled 6 overs in the match, conceding 21 runs.

External links
Chaminda Niroshan at Cricket Archive 

Sri Lankan cricketers
Moratuwa Sports Club cricketers
Living people
Place of birth missing (living people)
Year of birth missing (living people)